Lissodema is a genus of beetles belonging to the family Salpingidae.

Species:
 Lissodema cursor
 Lissodema denticolle
 Lissodema lituratum

References

Salpingidae